Gymnastics events have been staged at the Olympic Games since 1896. Spanish female gymnasts have participated in every Summer Olympics since 1960, except for 1964 and 1968. A total of 48 female gymnasts have represented Spain. Spanish women have won one medal at the Olympics – the 2004 floor exercise bronze, which was won by Patricia Moreno.

Gymnasts

Medalists

References

gymnasts
Spain
Olympic